Mian Saqib Nisar (born 18 January 1954) is a Pakistani jurist who served as the 25th Chief Justice of Pakistan from 31 December 2016 till 17 January 2019. He has previously served as the Law Secretary. He also served as a visiting professor of law at the University of Punjab where he provided instructions on constitutional law.

Ascended as the Justice of the Supreme Court on 18 February 2010, he was elevated as chief justice when Justice Anwar Zaheer Jamali reached his constitutionally set retiring age.

Early life and education

His father Mian Nisar was an advocate who belonged to an Arain family of Lahore. Nisar was educated at the Cathedral High School no 1 in Lahore where he matriculated and enrolled at Government College University (GCU) where he graduated with a B.A. degree in 1977. He later went to attend the Punjab University where he secured LLB in civil law in 1980.

While being an undergraduate student at the GCU Lahore, he was selected to be a member of the international delegation representing Pakistan in International Youth Conference held in Tripoli in Libya in 1973.

Career

Early career

Soon after his graduation with a law degree, Nisar enrolled as an advocate and began private practice of law at the District Court in 1980. In 1982, he enrolled as an advocate of the Lahore High Court. He practiced law as an advocate for a decade until he enrolled as an advocate Supreme Court in 1992, subsequently relocating to Islamabad. In 1991, he was elected as a Secretary-General of the Lahore High Court bar.

On 29 March 1997, he was appointed as Law Secretary at the Ministry of Justice and Law (MoJL)– a chief bureaucratic position inside the law and justice ministry. His appointment as the Law Secretary of Pakistan was nominated and confirmed by Prime Minister Nawaz Sharif immediately after being elected in general elections held in 1997. His appointment as a law secretary was noted as the first time in the history of the country that some one from the Bar had been appointed to such post.

On 22 May 1998, he was elevated as judge at the Lahore High Court after a nomination summary sent by Prime Minister Sharif, only to be confirmed as judge of Lahore High Court by then-President Rafiq Tarrar. As a judge in Lahore High Court, he heard and passed judgements on many important cases involving the resolution of disputes on the civil matters, commercial banking disputes, and tax evasions/avoidances.

In 2000, Nisar was among those judges at the Lahore High Court, who when given chance to either resign or accept military provisional constitutional order enacted by Military Dictator General Musharraf, took the oath under the new provisional constitutional order and was continue to allow hearing cases at the Lahore High Court.

Academia

Justice Nisar is known for his educational interests in legal education, and is currently tenuring as visiting professor of law at the Law College of the Punjab University where he provides instructions on the constitutional law and civil law procedure. Justice Nisar attended and represented Pakistan in the international conference on "India and Pakistan at Fifty" held in Wilton Park in United Kingdom; he also led judicial delegations on conferences held in the Philippines and Switzerland.

In 2009, Justice Nisar authored a paper on Islam and democracy and presented the paper to the Norwegian Academy of Science and Letters in Oslo, Norway, and offered discussion on the "Role of the Courts in Islamic Democratic Society."

Supreme Court Justice

On 13 February 2010, his nomination to be elevated as the justice of the Supreme Court was initially rejected by the then-President Asif Ali Zardari in spite of recommendation made by Chief Justice Iftikhar Muhammad Chaudhry. President Zardari instead elevated Justice K.M. Sharif that ultimately supersedes senior-most Justice Nisar for the promotion, appointing the latter as acting Chief Justice of Lahore High Court.

Upon hearing these developments, Chief Justice Chaudhry suspended the appointment order and marked such actions as "unconstitutional", using his constitutional powers granted by the Judicial Commission.

On 19 February 2010, Justice Nisar, alongside A.S. Khosa, were sworn as justices of the Supreme Court in a simple ceremony.

Notable cases

He was a member of the Supreme Court bench which heard the case against 21st Constitutional Amendment, the amendment which authorized the establishment of military courts to hear terrorism cases after the incident which killed 141 people including 132 children in a school in Peshawar on 16 December 2014.

He also heard the case where Pakistan Railways's land worth Rs10 billion was allotted to Royal Palm Golf Club by Musharraf government which federal government of Nawaz Sharif wanted back in 2014.

He headed the bench which heard the case of Jehangir Khan Tareen and Imran Khan.

Criticism

Judicial activism and allegations of nexus with military 
Justice Nisar has been criticized by some notable academics, journalists and politicians for his judicial activism and over-involvement in day-to-day affairs of the government. He is accused of being in alliance with Pakistan's military establishment against Pakistan Muslim League (N), Nawaz Sharif and his government which was ousted in July 2017.

Despite Election Commission of Pakistan ordering to provide security to all candidates contesting in General Elections 2018, he ordered removal of security from all non-government but high-profile politicians, most of who had been part of the previous governments which included PML(N) and JUI politicians. Some of them has been under threat from terrorists including Tehreek-e-Taliban Pakistan and Lashkar-e-Jhangvi. This was seen by many political parties as political victimization. Their claim was further strengthened when a leader of ANP, Mr Bilour was killed by suicide bomber on 10 July 2018 in Peshawar during election campaign. Raisani and 127 others were killed on 13 July 2018.

References

External links 
www.supremecourt.gov.pk/

1954 births
Living people
Government College University, Lahore alumni
University of the Punjab alumni
Judges of the Lahore High Court
Chief justices of Pakistan
Academic staff of the University of the Punjab